Modern Yazawin ( lit: Modern History) is a 2014 Burmese romantic comedy film starring Khant Sithu, Wai Lu Kyaw, Pyay Ti Oo, Khin Hlaing, Wutt Hmone Shwe Yi, Htun Eaindra Bo and Sandi Myint Lwin. The film theatrical released in Myanmar on July 18, 2014.

Synopsis
Nay Kha and Kyaw Kyar arrived unexpectedly to the sixth century AD. Nay Kha fell in love with Htake Htar, daughter of Myo Sar Min. And the love story continued.

Cast
Khant Sithu as San Sar. Other life name is Myo Sar Min.
Pyay Ti Oo as Nay Kha
Khin Hlaing as Kyaw Kyar 
Wai Lu Kyaw as Moe Thee
Wutt Hmone Shwe Yi as Htake Htar
Htun Eaindra Bo as Daw Kyar Thit. Other life name is Daw Maydarwi (Takedishin Manawmaya Sayama Gyi).
Sandi Myint Lwin as Akyin Nar Thit. Other life name is Baydaryi.

References

2014 films
2014 romantic comedy films
Burmese romantic comedy films